"Inside Yourself" is a song by American rock band Godsmack. It was released as a single for free download in October 2015.

Charts

References

2015 singles
2015 songs
Godsmack songs
Songs written by Sully Erna